The men's 94 kilograms event at the 2014 Asian Games took place on 25 September 2014 at Moonlight Festival Garden Weightlifting Venue.

Schedule
All times are Korea Standard Time (UTC+09:00)

Records 

 Ilya Ilyin's world and Asian records were rescinded in 2016.

Results 
Legend
NM — No mark

References

External links
 Official website

Weightlifting at the 2014 Asian Games